Clivina komareki is a species of ground beetle in the subfamily Scaritinae. It was described by Kult in 1951.

References

komareki
Beetles described in 1951